Mohammad Afzal is the name of:

 Mawlawi Mohammad Afzal (c. 1925–2012), jihadi leader of Nuristan in the 1980s and 1990s
 Mohammad Afzal (Emirati cricketer) (born 1973), Emirati cricketer
 Mohammad Afzal (Hyderabad cricketer) (born 1955), Pakistani cricketer of the 1970s and 1980s
 Mohammad Afzal (Multan cricketer) (born 1955), Pakistani cricketer of the 1980s and 1990s
 Mohammad Afzal (politician) (1913–2008), Pakistani politician and judge
 Mohammad Afzal Guru (1969–2013), Kashmiri convicted of participating in the 2001 attacks on the Indian Parliament
 Mohammad Afzal Khan (1811–1867), Emir of Afghanistan
 Mohammad Anwar Afzal (born 1926), Afghan footballer

See also
 Muhammad Afzal (disambiguation)